Pahalagammedda is a village in Sri Lanka. Pahalagammedda may also refer to the following villages in Sri Lanka
Kengalla Pahalagammedda 
Pallegama Pahalagammedda 
Werapitiya Pahalagammedda